Leptonotis perplexus is a species of small limpet-like sea snail, a marine gastropod mollusk in the family Hipponicidae, the hoof snails.

Description

Distribution
This marine species is endemic to New Zealand

References

External links
 Te Papa Tongarewa : Leptonotis perplexus

Hipponicidae
Gastropods described in 1907